The Yenadis also spelled Yanadi are one of the Scheduled tribes of India. They live in Andhra Pradesh in Nellore, Chittoor and Prakasam districts. The tribe is divided among three subgroups: the Manchi Yanadi, Adavi Yanadi, and Challa Yanadi.

Yanadhi is a corruption of the word "Andati" (Aborigines), meaning "having no beginning."form.
In the early 20th century, they were still living a hunter-gatherer lifestyle. Edgar Thurston speculated their name was derived from the Sanskrit anadi, 'without origin.' Some claim to be the original inhabitants of their region, others claimed to be descended from the Chenchus. At the time a local tradition claimed they had provided food for a saint a long time before, who had taught them how to drive out snakes from their area. They used to live on Sriharikota, which later became the launch site for ISRO.

At the turn of the 20th century, the Reddi Yanadis were cooks in Reddy households, who didn't mingle with other subsections of the tribe. Others followed a hunter-gatherer lifestyle, and occasionally were employed as watchmen. They have immense knowledge of the surrounding forests, flora, fauna and herbs. They ate forest fauna and gathered fruits of the forest.

They traditionally lived in conical huts through which adults had to squat to enter. Widows, especially those with more husbands, were respected as judges of adultery and other crimes. They practiced polygamy, and 1 man even had 7 wives.

In 2011 their population was 537,808.

The Yanadi speak a dialect of Telugu.

References

Sources
https://web.archive.org/web/20110305134922/http://www.aptribes.gov.in/html/tcr-studies-eci-yenadis.htm

Scheduled Tribes of India
Social groups of Andhra Pradesh
Tribal communities of Andhra Pradesh